The Business Intelligence and Reporting Tools (BIRT) Project is an open source software project that provides reporting and business intelligence capabilities for rich client and web applications, especially those based on Java and Java EE. BIRT is a top-level software project within the Eclipse Foundation, an independent not-for-profit consortium of software industry vendors and an open source community.

The project's stated goals are to address a wide range of reporting needs within a typical application, ranging from operational or enterprise reporting to multi-dimensional online analytical processing (OLAP). Initially, the project has focused on and delivered capabilities that allow application developers to easily design and integrate reports into applications.

The project is supported by an active community of users at BIRT Developer Center and developers at the Eclipse.org BIRT Project page.

BIRT has two main components: a visual report designer within the Eclipse IDE for creating BIRT Reports, and a runtime component for generating reports that can be deployed to any Java environment. The BIRT project also includes a charting engine that is both fully integrated into the report designer and can be used standalone to integrate charts into an application.

BIRT Report designs are persisted as XML and can access a number of different data sources including JDO datastores, JFire Scripting Objects, POJOs, SQL databases, Web Services and XML.

History 
The BIRT project was first proposed and sponsored by Actuate Corporation when Actuate joined the Eclipse Foundation as a Strategic Developer on August 24, 2004. The project was subsequently approved and became a top-level project within the Eclipse community on October 6, 2004 The project contributor community includes IBM, and Innovent Solutions.

In 2007 IBM's Tivoli Division adopted BIRT as the infrastructure for its Tivoli Common Reporting (TCR) product. TCR produces historical reports on Tivoli-managed IT resources and processes.

The initial project code base was designed and developed by Actuate beginning in early 2004 and donated to the Eclipse Foundation when the project was approved.

Versions

References

Bibliography

External links
Eclipse BIRT project home page

2005 software
Business intelligence software
Free reporting software
Free software programmed in Java (programming language)
Eclipse (software)
Eclipse technology
Eclipse software